"Testify" is a song by the band Parliament. It is a funk reworking of the song "(I Wanna) Testify", which was originally recorded in 1967 by The Parliaments and reached #3 on the Billboard R&B chart. This new version was the second single released from the 1974 album Up for the Down Stroke, and the second track on the album.

Original mix
The version of "Testify" included on early pressings of Up for the Down Stroke featured a mix that highlighted the group vocals and deemphasized the instrumental sound. On later pressings this was replaced by a version with different, more rhythm-intensive mix - the version heard on the song's single release. The original mix of the song was included as a bonus track on the 2003 CD reissue of the album.

The version of this song on the original album release also deleted a small portion of the clavinet introduction. This was restored on the 1993 compilation release Tear the Roof Off 1974-1980.

Parliament (band) songs
1974 singles
Songs written by George Clinton (funk musician)
Casablanca Records singles
1974 songs